BAFC can stand for:
 Barrow Association Football Club, an English football (soccer) club
 Banstead Athletics Football Club, an English football (soccer) club
 Bishop Auckland Football Club, an English football (soccer) club
 Bradford A.F.C., commonly known as Bradford Park Avenue A.F.C.
 Burton Albion Football Club, an English football (soccer) club
 Bethesda Athletic F.C., a Welsh football club

See also
 BFC (disambiguation)